The fourth season of the American drama/adventure television series Alias premiered January 5, 2005 on ABC and concluded May 25, 2005 and was released on DVD in region 1 on October 25, 2005. Guest stars in season four include Sônia Braga, Joel Grey, Michael McKean, Lena Olin, Isabella Rossellini .

Speaking of the previous season, J. J. Abrams said: "We weren't as true to the characters. They became pawns in a plot-driven story." He described the season as a year of "reinvention", which refocused on relationships.

Unlike all other seasons of the series, the fourth season aired entirely during the latter half of the American television season, allowing for a more continuous run.  Only one Wednesday evening (February 2) was skipped in this run, so as not to coincide with the 2005 State of the Union Address from President George W. Bush.

The scheduling shift for the fourth season was prompted by displacement of the series from its previous time slot (Sundays 9:00 p.m. ET/8:00 p.m. CT), due to the success of Alias fall replacement — season one of Desperate Housewives.  ABC's other notable new series from the season, Lost, became the lead-in program for Alias.  A new night, new lead-in, and noticeable lack of weeks without new episode broadcasts are thought to have contributed to some of the series' best overall ratings during its five-season run.

CastMain characters Jennifer Garner as Sydney Bristow (22 episodes)
 Ron Rifkin as Arvin Sloane (21 episodes)
 Michael Vartan as Michael Vaughn (22 episodes)
 Carl Lumbly as Marcus Dixon (20 episodes)
 Kevin Weisman as Marshall Flinkman (21 episodes)
 Mía Maestro as Nadia Santos (21 episodes)
 Greg Grunberg as Eric Weiss (20 episodes)
 Victor Garber as Jack Bristow (22 episodes)Recurring characters'

Episodes

Home release
The 6-DVD box set of Season 4 was released in region 1 format (US) on October 25, 2005, in region 2 format (UK) on November 21, 2005 and in region 4 format (AU) on January 16, 2006. The DVDs contain all episodes of Season 4, plus the following features:

 Original "Nocturne" episode featuring the unaired Russian Roulette scene
 Agent Weiss: Spy Camera – a narrated slide-show of digital photos taken behind the scenes by Greg Grunberg
 Audio Commentaries With Cast And Crew
 A Chat With Jennifer Garner
 Meet Mia: Syd's Little Sister
 Marshall's World – a comedic behind-the-scenes tour hosted by Kevin Weisman
 The Guest Stars Of Season 4
 ALIAS Blooper Reel
 Director's Diary
 Anatomy Of A Scene
 Deleted Scenes

References

External links

 

2005 American television seasons
Alias (TV series) seasons